LK-700 was a Soviet direct ascent lunar lander program proposed in 1964. It was developed by Vladimir Chelomey as an alternative to the N1-L3 program. It was also a further development of the LK-1 lunar flyby spacecraft.

It would have been launched using the proposed UR-700 rocket (related to the Proton rocket) with a crew of three cosmonauts on a direct flight to the lunar surface and back.
The direct landing approach would allow the Soviets to land anywhere on the moon's nearside. The program was canceled in 1974.

Mission profile

Uncrewed flights would be followed by  crewed flights. The proposed schedule was:
 May 1972: First UR-700/LK-700 uncrewed launch. Subsequent launches in November 1972 and April 1973.
 April 1973: First crewed UR-700/LK-700 launch. Subsequent flights in August and October 1973.

Following initial LK-700 landings, the more ambitious Lunar Expeditionary Complex (LKE) would be delivered to the surface in three UR-700 launches:
 Launch 1: lunar station to enable a six-month stay
 Launch 2: LK-700 with crew
 Launch 3: large rover

Characteristics
 Crew size: 3
 Orbital storage: 45 days
 Spacecraft delta v: 9,061 m/s
 Gross mass: 154,000 kg  
 Height: 21.20 m
 Span: 2.70 m
 Thrust: 131.40 kN
 Specific impulse: 326 s

References

Crewed spacecraft
Cancelled Soviet spacecraft
Soviet lunar program
Crewed space program of the Soviet Union
NPO Mashinostroyeniya products